For My Broken Heart is the seventeenth studio album by American country music singer Reba McEntire, released on October 1, 1991. It was the first album recorded after an airplane crash which killed most of the members of her touring band. The album is, as McEntire states in the album's notes, "a form of healing for all our broken hearts" and the songs were chosen to that effect.

The album was led off by its title track, which was followed by "Is There Life Out There". "The Night the Lights Went Out in Georgia", originally a 1972 hit for Vicki Lawrence, was also accompanied by a video when it was released as the album's third single. It became her highest-charting album on the Billboard 200 chart at that time, peaking at number 13. It is also one of McEntire's biggest-selling studio albums - selling 4 million copies.

The album debuted at number 4 for the week of October 19, 1991. It peaked at number 3 for the week of November 2, 1991. It stayed at number 3 for 7 consecutive weeks. It stayed in the Top Ten for 20 consecutive weeks.   It was the first album by a female country artist to be certified 2× platinum by the RIAA.

Track listing

Personnel

 Reba McEntire – lead and backing vocals
 John Barlow Jarvis – keyboards
 Matt Rollings – keyboards
 Steve Gibson – acoustic guitar, electric guitar
 Michael Thompson – electric guitar
 Steve Fishell – steel guitar
 John Hughey – steel guitar
 Mark O'Connor – fiddle, mandolin
 Leland Sklar – bass guitar
 Larrie Londin – drums
 Bob Bailey – backing vocals (1, 6)
 Kim Fleming – backing vocals (1, 6)
 Vicki Hampton – backing vocals (1, 6)
 Yvonne Hodges – backing vocals (1, 6)
 Pamela Quinlan – backing vocals 
 Linda Davis – backing vocals
 Vince Gill – backing vocals
 Harry Stinson – backing vocals

Production
 Tony Brown – producer 
 Reba McEntire – producer 
 John Guess – recording, mixing, mastering 
 Marty Williams – assistant engineer, mastering
 Jessie Noble – project coordinator 
 Mickey Braithwaite – art direction, design 
 Jim McGuire – photography

Charts

Weekly charts

Year-end charts

Singles

Certifications and sales

References

1991 albums
Reba McEntire albums
MCA Records albums
Albums produced by Tony Brown (record producer)